The Casa Agostini, in Yauco, Puerto Rico, is a Classical Revival house designed by Miguel Briganti Pinti. It was built in the early 1800s and was listed on the National Register of Historic Places in 1988.

It is a two-story stuccoed masonry commercial and residential building that is L-shaped in plan. Its  main facade has eight bays.

It served as a coffee warehouse and processing plant, as well as a residence and was built for Corsican immigrant Jose Maria Agostini Santini.

References

National Register of Historic Places in Yauco, Puerto Rico
Neoclassical architecture in Puerto Rico
Residential buildings on the National Register of Historic Places in Puerto Rico
Warehouses on the National Register of Historic Places
Coffee production
19th-century establishments in Puerto Rico